Little Big may refer to:
 Little Big (band), a Russian electro-rave band
LITTLE, big, a 2002 album by Terry Scott Taylor
Little, Big, a 1981 fantasy novel by John Crowley
Little Big Painting, a painting by Roy Lichtenstein

See also
ARM big.LITTLE, a computer processor core
Little Big Adventure, a video game
Little Big Star, a television singing contest
Little Big Town, a country music band
Little Bighorn (disambiguation)
LittleBigPlanet, a video game for the PlayStation 3 console